The International Somalia Contact Group is an informal, ad-hoc formed International Contact Group of mainly western UN Ambassadors that was established at the United Nations headquarters in New York City in June 2006 to support "peace and reconciliation" in Somalia.

Members
The original members of the group were:

 United States - at whose initiative the group formed
 Norway - which chaired the first meeting
 Italy
 Sweden
 Tanzania
 United Kingdom
 The European Union Presidency and Commission

Invited as observers were:

 The African Union
 The Intergovernmental Authority on Development
 The League of Arab States
 The United Nations

Kenya was reported to have been unhappy that it had not been invited to join the group.

Notes and references

Foreign relations of Somalia
United Nations operations in Somalia
2006 in international relations
Somalia–United States relations
Diplomatic umbrella groups